{{DISPLAYTITLE:Theta2 Crucis}}

Theta2 Crucis, Latinized from θ2 Crucis, is a spectroscopic binary star in the constellation Crux. This pair of stars complete an orbit every 3.4280 days and they have a low orbital eccentricity that is close to 0.0. Theta2 Crucis is located at about 690 light-years from the Sun.

Since a member of the system is a β Cephei-type variable star, the magnitude is not fixed but varies slightly between +4.70 and +4.74. The period of this variability is 0.0889 days. The system is categorized as is a blue-white B-type main sequence star with a stellar classification of B3 V, although it has also been classified as a subgiant.  Evolutionary models show it at a late stage of its main sequence life.

References

Crucis, Theta2
Beta Cephei variables
Crux (constellation)
Spectroscopic binaries
B-type subgiants
4603
104841
058867
Durchmusterung objects